Kuria may refer to:

 Kuria people, an ethnic group of Tanzania and Kenya
 Kuria District, a former district in Kenya
 Kuria Constituency
 Kuria, a Kenyan name from the Kikuyu people
Gibson Kamau Kuria (born 1947), Kenyan lawyer
Manasses Kuria (1929–2005), Kenyan Anglican Archbishop
Ruth Wanjiru Kuria (born 1981), Kenyan long-distance road runner
 Kuria (islands), the collective name of the Kiribati islands of Buariki and Oneeke
 Kuria Muria, another name for the Khuriya Muriya Islands of Oman
 Kuria, variant of kyria, κυρία, the Greek title of respect for a woman.  See Kira (given name).
 Kuria, a collection of Orokin statues in Warframe
 , the Hungarian name for the Curia of Hungary, sometimes used in English

Kenyan names